Aporocotylidae is a family of trematodes within the order Diplostomida, which contains species commonly known as fish blood flukes. It contains more than 40 genera, the largest being Cardicola.  Species in this family parasite fish in both fresh and marine water.

Genera 

 Acipensericola Bullard, Snyder, Jensen & Overstreet, 2008
 Adelomyllos Nolan & Cribb, 2004 
 Ankistromeces Nolan & Cribb, 2004
 Aporocotyle Odhner, 1900
 Cardallagium Yong, Cutmore, Jones, Gauthier & Cribb, 2017
 Cardicola Short, 1953
 Chaulioleptos Nolan & Cribb, 2005
 Chimaerohemecus van der Land, 1967
 Cladocaecum Orelis-Ribeiro & Bullard, 2016
 Cruoricola Herbert, Shaharom-Harrison & Overstreet, 1994
 Deontacylix Linton, 1910
 Elaphrobates Bullard & Overstreet, 2003
 Elopicola Bullard, 2014
 Holocentricola Cutmore & Cribb, 2021 
 Hyperandrotrema Maillard & Ktari, 1978
 Kritsky Orelis-Ribeiro & Bullard, 2016
 Littorellicola Bullard, 2010
 Metaplehniella Lebedev & Parukhin, 1972
 Myliobaticola Bullard & Jensen, 2008
 Neoparacardicola Yamaguti, 1970
 Orchispirium Madhavi & Hanumantha Rao, 1970
 Paracardicoloides Martin, 1974
 Paradeontacylix McIntosh, 1934
 Parasanguinicola Herbert & Shaharom, 1995
 Pearsonellum Overstreet & Køie, 1989
 Phthinomita Nolan & Cribb, 2006
 Plethorchis Martin, 1975
 Primisanguis Bullard, Williams & Bunkley-Williams, 2012
 Psettarium Goto & Ozaki, 1930
 Pseudocardicola Parukhin, 1985
 Rhaphidotrema Yong & Cribb, 2011
 Sanguinicola Plehn, 1905
 Selachohemecus Short, 1954
 Skoulekia Alama-Bermejo, Montero, Raga & Holzer, 2011

References 

Diplostomida
Fauna of the Atlantic Ocean